Balloch is an area of Cumbernauld, Scotland, located north of the M80 motorway and west of Cumbernauld Town Centre. It is also known as Eastfield or Balloch Eastfield. Nearby neighbourhoods include Smithstone, Westfield and Craigmarloch.

History
Balloch's name comes from a farm on the Cumbernauld Estate of the Fleming family. It is a derivative of Scottish Gaelic bealach, meaning a pass among hills or mountains. The area it now occupies used to be covered by Balloch Farm on the west side (located at the site of the Forge Community Centre at Ben Lawers Drive) and Eastfield Holdings on the east side (some of the buildings of which still exist). Balloch is a mainly residential area of privately owned homes, although a number of council-owned houses were built when the area was first established in the 1970s, which are also now largely privately owned – this neighbourhood is commonly referred to locally as Eastfield while the private housing, containing a large number of detached bungalows and villas, is known as Balloch, even though the former council estate is near the old farm and the private housing is closer to Eastfield Cemetery.

The National Cycle Route 75, which runs between Edinburgh and Glasgow, passes by Balloch.

Sport

Football
Balloch shares a youth football team with Eastfield called Balloch Eastfield, which runs teams at most age groups. Balloch Eastfield F.C. also run various fundraisers through the year, which allows them to make charitable contributions on a regular basis. Balloch Eastfield FC was founded in 1986, and is in a strong position to continue for a good number of years.

The local amateur team Eastfield AFC was founded in 2002; they reached the final of the Scottish Amateur Cup in 2019. Players have included the former captain of Botswana and the brothers Tyler and Dale Fulton, whose father Steve is involved in coaching the squad.

References

External links
Balloch Eastfield Community Council
Balloch location at Geodaisy
Balloch at Scottish Search

Areas of Cumbernauld